Symphoricarpos mollis, with the common names creeping snowberry, Southern California snowberry, and trip vine, is a shrub in the Honeysuckle Family (Caprifoliaceae). It is found in western North America from British Columbia to California inland to Nevada and Idaho.

Range and habitat

The shrub does well in warm climates and can tolerate both intense sun and constant shade. It is a plant of chaparral ecosystems, especially along coastlines.

Growth pattern
The plant is a creeping shrub, low growing and straggling, with stems that can reach several feet while the height limited to only about 1 1/2 ft. It reproduces both from via rhizome and seed.

Leaves and stems
Leaves are opposite. Stems are flexible.

Inflorescence
It bears bunches of red or pink rounded, bell-shaped flowers and spherical or bulbous white or pink-tinted fruits.

The fruits are not generally considered toxic but are distasteful, having a soapy texture due to the presence of saponins.

References

External links
Jepson Manual Treatment, University of California
United States Department of Agriculture National Forest Service, Fire ecology
Calphotos Photo gallery, University of California

mollis
Flora of British Columbia
Flora of the Western United States
Garden plants of North America
Drought-tolerant plants
Plants described in 1841
Bird food plants
Flora without expected TNC conservation status